Beauty in the Beast is a studio album from the American keyboardist and composer Wendy Carlos, released in 1986, on Audion Records, her first for a label other than Columbia Records since 1968. The album uses alternate musical tunings and scales, influenced by jazz and world music. On the back she includes a quote by Van Gogh: "I am always doing what I cannot do yet, in order to learn how to do it."

As the liner notes state, the entire album is synthesized, meaning that "All the music and sounds heard on this recording were directly digitally generated. This eliminates all the limitations of microphones, the weak link necessary in nearly all other digital recordings, including those that use 'sampling' technologies."

Track listing

Reviews
Dave Benson wrote:

References

Microtonality
Wendy Carlos albums
Albums produced by Wendy Carlos
1986 albums